The Metchosin Igneous Complex is an ophiolite sequence in southwestern British Columbia, Canada, located at the southern end of Vancouver Island. It is the northernmost expression of the Siletzia terrane and consists of three rock units, including a basaltic sequence, a sheeted dike complex and gabbro stocks.

See also
Volcanism of Western Canada

References

Ophiolites
Volcanism of British Columbia
Southern Vancouver Island